The Barnes Review (TBR) is a bi-monthly magazine founded in 1994 by Willis Carto's Liberty Lobby and headquartered in Washington, D.C. The Southern Poverty Law Center describes The Barnes Review as "one of the most virulent anti-Semitic organizations around"; the journal and website are "dedicated to historical revisionism and Holocaust denial."

The journal is named after the Holocaust denier Harry Elmer Barnes. Linked with it is a TBR Bookclub, promoting what the SPLC describes as "a wide range of extremist books and publications". The organization also holds conferences with speakers such as Ted Gunderson. "Claiming that its mission is to 'tell the whole truth about history,' TBR really practices an extremist form of revisionist history that includes defending the Nazi regime, denying the Holocaust, discounting the evils of slavery, and promoting white nationalism", according to the SPLC.

Willis Carto, who founded the Institute for Historical Review in 1979, used to be associated with the organisation but lost control in an internal takeover by former associates. Eustace Mullins was a contributing editor.

References

External links

Bimonthly magazines published in the United States
Political magazines published in the United States
Holocaust denial in the United States
Magazines established in 1994
Magazines published in Washington, D.C.
Far-right publications in the United States
Holocaust-denying websites